The Ten Days of Repentance (ʿǍseret yəmēy təšūvā)                        Hebrew [ʔaˈseʁet jeˈmeiː teʃuːˈvaːh] are the first ten days of the Hebrew month of Tishrei, usually sometime in the month of September, beginning with the Jewish New Year Rosh Hashanah and ending with the conclusion of Yom Kippur.

Introduction

During this time it is considered appropriate for Jews to practice Teshuvah (literally: "returning" or "repentance") which is examining one's ways, engaging in repentance and the improvement of their ways in anticipation of Yom Kippur. A "penitent" is referred to as a baal teshuva ("master [of] repentance"). This repentance can be expressed in early morning prayers, known as selichot, which capture the penitential spirit appropriate to the occasion and charity, acts of Hesed ("loving-kindness"), or self-reflection.

The days

The first two days of the Ten Days of Repentance are on Rosh Hashanah. One of those days may occur on a Shabbat as well, making that day of Rosh Hashanah on which Shabbat occurs stricter in observance, meaning the observances of Shabbat are followed than a Rosh Hashanah that occurs on any other day but Shabbat (Saturday). When Rosh Hashanah occurs on a Shabbat a few additional prayers in the mahzor ("prayer book") are added as well as excluded in keeping with the combined theme of a Rosh Hashanah and Shabbat combination.

The third day is Fast of Gedalia except when Rosh Hashanah occurs on Thursday and Friday, in which case the Fast of Gedalia is postponed until Sunday. It is a half day fast, meaning it is only observed from dawn of the third day until dusk of that same day.

After Rosh Hashanah ends and before Yom Kippur starts the next notable day is the special Shabbat that has its own name Shabbat Shuvah ("Sabbath [of] Return") which gets its name from the Haftarah read after the weekly Torah portion, which starts with the word "Shuva" literally meaning "Return!", thus playing into the theme of the Ten Days.

The tenth day is the last and it is always the serious Biblically mandated fast of Yom Kippur.  decrees that Yom Kippur is a strict day of rest and of fasting. Yom Kippur can also fall out (meaning be observed) on a Shabbat, one of the rare times when fasting is allowed on that day. Even when it is on a regular weekday, Yom Kippur is still observed as a "Shabbat" because in the Torah it is referred to as a שבת שבתון "Sabbath [of] Sabbaths" .

Observances

Three of the main observances are themes that are repeated in both the Rosh Hashanah and Yom Kippur prayer services and printed in every mahzor ("holiday prayer book") of those two holy days: "Repentance, Prayer and Charity (teshuva, tefila, tzedaka) remove the evil decree":

"In almost all editions of the Rosh Hashanah and Yom Kippur machzor, the words ותשובה ותפלה וצדקה repentance, prayer, and charity, are crowned in smaller type with the words [respectively] צום קול ממון, fast, voice, money. These superscripts are meant to indicate that sincere repentance includes fasting, prayer recited in a loud voice, and donations to charity.

Rosh Hashanah rituals

There are many observances, customs, rituals and prayers said and performed on Rosh Hashanah, such as: 

Tashlikh the symbolic "casting off" of one sins at a river, lake or ocean, only a custom, not mandated by the Torah.
Kittel, white robe worn by some men as custom during day time services, also worn on night and day on Yom Kippur. This custom unique to Ashkenazic communities, and in many Eastern Ashkenazic communities it is observed only on Yom Kippur but not on Rosh Hashanah.
Avinu Malkeinu "Our Father Our King" prayer is recited.
Piyyutim, extra poetical prayers added by the rabbis of the Middle Ages.
Symbolic fruits and foods known as "simanim" or "signs" in Hebrew, eaten as symbolic good signs to evoke good omens and benevolent Divine providence at the festive night meals, as customs but not required by the Torah.
Lekach a symbolic honey cake eaten by some, as a custom. Not required by the Torah or the rabbis.
As with all Jewish festivals, practicing Jews will not use any electronic devices during the holiday.

Fasting

There is an old custom to fast all weekdays of the Ten Days of Repentance (except for the eve of Yom Kippur when fasting is forbidden) and there were those who had the custom to fast during the day on Rosh Hashanah. Nevertheless, the common custom today is to fast only on Fast of Gedalia (from dawn to dusk) and for the full day of Yom Kippur.

Money in any form is not handled or carried on Jewish holidays according to Jewish law, but promises to make donations are allowed.

Daily selichot

In most communities, Selichot are recited around midnight or in the early morning on all weekdays of the Ten Days of Repentance. Indeed, the recitation of Selichot begins before the Ten Days of Repentance; in the Ashkenazic tradition, they begin after the Sabbath immediately proceeding Rosh Hashanah (or on the Sabbath before that if Rosh Hashanah falls on a Monday or Tuesday), and in the Sephardic tradition they begin immediately after Rosh Chodesh Elul.

Shabbat Shuvah

Shabbat Shuvah ("Sabbath [of] Return" שבת שובה) or Shabbat Teshuvah ("Sabbath [of] Repentance" שבת תשובה) refers to the Shabbat that occurs during the Ten Days of Repentance between Rosh Hashanah and Yom Kippur. This Shabbat is named after the first word of the Haftarah that is read on that day, and literally means "Return!" The alternative name, Shabbat Teshuvah (Sabbath of Repentance), is due to its being one of the Aseret Yemei Teshuvah (Ten Day of Repentance).

Kapparot

Some Jews and communities have the custom of performing Kapparot during a weekday, a ritual in which either a chicken or money is swung over one's head usually three times as a symbolic atonement by the chicken or the money "assuming the sins" of the one performing the ritual. This custom is not required by the Torah.

Five prohibitions of Yom Kippur

On Yom Kippur additional prohibitions are observed similar to the fast of Tisha B'Av, as detailed in the Jewish oral tradition (Mishnah tractate Yoma 8:1) because the Torah  stipulates that ועניתם את נפשתיכם "and you shall afflict your souls" and the Talmud therefore defines self-imposed "affliction" during Yom Kippur only, as follows:

 No eating and drinking
 No wearing of shoes with leather soles
 No bathing or washing
 No anointing oneself with perfumes or lotions
 No sexual relations

As on all major Jewish holidays, practicing Jews will not do any type of "work", including use any electronic devices during the holiday.  However, like the Sabbath and unlike other holidays, most forms of food preparation are also prohibited on Yom Kippur.

Yom Kippur is over at sundown on the end of the tenth of Tishrei at nightfall but is 'confirmed' as concluded after the recitation of the Kaddish following the end of ne'ila ("closing") prayer and the shofar is sounded. The services end in joy with the hope that all have been inscribed in the Book of Life.

Changes and additions in the prayers

As detailed in the Jewish Encyclopedia:

 The Talmud (Berakhot 12b) mentions that on these days the close of the third benediction in the "'Amidah" reads "the Holy King" instead of "the Holy God"; and that on work-days the close of the eighth benediction reads "the King of Judgment" (lit. "the King, the Judgment") instead of "King loving righteousness and judgment."
 The treatise Soferim, dating from the seventh or eighth century, mentions (xix. 8) some insertions which were made in the first and second benedictions and in the last two, and which are now found in all prayer-books; in the first (after "for the sake of His Name in love"): "Remember us for life, King who delights in life; and inscribe us in the book of life, for Your sake, living God"; in the second (after "make salvation to grow"): "Who is like You, merciful Father, remembering His creatures in mercy for life"; in the last but one, near the end: "And inscribe for life all the sons of Your covenant"; in the last benediction immediately before the close: "May we be remembered and inscribed before You in the book of life, of blessing, of peace, and of good sustenance." In the last service of Day of Atonement (Yom Kippur) "seal" is used in the place of "inscribe" throughout. In the Ashkenazi Jews' ritual, at the close of the last benediction, the words "who blesseth his people Israel with peace" are shortened into "the Maker of Peace."
 The invocations beginning "Avinu Malkeinu" (Our Father, our King) are read in the morning and afternoon services of the Ten Days; in the Ashkenazic rite, they are omitted on the Sabbath, Friday afternoons, and the 9th of Tishrei, the eve of the Day of Atonement, which is a sort of semi-holy day, and on which the penitential psalm with all its incidents is also omitted, whereas some non-Ashkenazic communities recite them even on the Sabbath.
 In the early morning of work-days, before the regular morning service, Selichot are read in a form or order very much like that observed on the night of Day of Atonement. The poetical pieces, at least in the Ashkenazi ritual, differ for each of the days. In the Eastern ahskenazic rite, those for the 9th of Tishri are the fewest and shortest, whereas in the Western Ashknazic rite they are the longest.

Services in synagogue

The services for the Days of Awe — Rosh Hashana and Yom Kippur — take on a solemn tone as befits these days. Traditional solemn tunes are used in the prayers. The musaf service on Rosh Hashana has nine blessings; the three middle blessings include biblical verses attesting to sovereignty, remembrance and the shofar, which is sounded 100 times during the service.

Additional customs

During these days some are stricter and eat only baked goods produced with a Jew involved in the baking process known as Pat Yisrael even though during the year they eat any kosher baked goods known as pat paltar. If while traveling it is not possible to obtain Pat Yisrael, then being stricter is not a requirement.

There are conflicting customs whether weddings should be held during the weekdays of the Ten Days: some Orthodox Jews avoid holding weddings during this more serious period, while other Orthodox Jews as well as non-Orthodox Jews may do so.

Origins of the Ten Days of Repentance

Maimonides' (1135–1204) Laws of Repentance in his Mishneh Torah is one of the most authoritative sources for the name and function of these days, but he draws on earlier sources:

"The term ... is not found in the Talmud Bavli, although the days referred to are mentioned there. The expression used in the Bavli is "the ten days between Rosh HaShanah and Yom HaKippurim." In the literature of the Geonim, we also find "the ten days from the beginning of Tishrei to Yom HaKippurim," "the first ten days of the month of Tishrei," "(the time) between Rosh HaShanah and Yom HaKippurim." But the term commonly used now, "Aseret Yemai Teshuvah," is also found in early sources. It is used in the Talmud Yerushalmi, by Pesikta Rabbati, a Midrash, and it is also found in the literature of the Geonim. But ever since the days of the Rishonim, literally the "first" or the "early" ones, referring to post-Talmudic and Geonic times; actually Torah scholars from approximately the eleventh century through the fifteenth, "Aseret Yemai Teshuvah" is the most popular title for this period of time in the Hebrew Calendar. The special character of these days ... in emphasis on "Teshuvah," Repentance, "Tefilla," Prayer and "Zehirut," Spiritual Vigilance."

Reasons of Maimonides

The most serious and comprehensive reasons behind the Ten Days of Repentance are derived from the works of Maimonides (known in Hebrew as the RAMBAM):

RAMBAM in "Hilchot Teshuvah," "The Laws of Repentance" (2:6), "Despite the fact that "Teshuvah" and crying out to HaShem are always timely, during the Ten Days between Rosh HaShanah and Yom HaKippurim it is exceedingly appropriate, and is accepted immediately, as it says, 'Seek HaShem when He is to be found' (Yeshayahu 55:6)." The source of this statement of the RAMBAM is Masechet Rosh HaShanah (18a) where it is written, "Seek HaShem when He is to be found - these are the days between Rosh HaShanah and Yom HaKippurim." The RAMBAM continues in "Hilchot Teshuvah" (3:4) "…Every person should view himself all year as if he were half innocent and half guilty. And that is the way he should look at the world as well, as if it were half innocent and half guilty... as it says "The Righteous Person is the Foundation of the World" - because his being righteous tipped the world for good, and saved it." "And because of this, the whole House of Israel have accustomed themselves to give more "Tzedakah" (Charity), and to do more good deeds, and to engage in "Mitzvot," from Rosh HaShanah through Yom HaKippurim more than the rest of the year. And they have all adopted the custom of rising at night during this ten-day period and praying in the synagogues prayers of supplication and entreaties until daylight."

References